Faradja is a genus of Central African orb-weaver spiders containing the single species, Faradja faradjensis. It was first described by M. Grasshoff in 1970, and has only been found in Middle Africa.

References

Araneidae
Monotypic Araneomorphae genera
Spiders of Africa